İkinci Əlicanlı (also, İkinci Alıcanlı, Alidzhanly Vtoryye, Alydzhanly, Alydzhanly Vtoroy, and Alydzhanly Vtoroye) is a village and municipality in the Zardab Rayon of Azerbaijan.  It has a population of 372.

References 

Populated places in Zardab District